The Constitution of Chile is the governing document that codifies the structure of the government of Chile.

The Chilean Constitution of 1980 is the current in-force constitution of Chile.

Previous actual or proposed constitutions of Chile include:
Chilean Constitution of 1833, the constitution used from 1833 to 1925
Chilean Constitution of 1925, the constitution used from 1925 to 1973
The 2022 proposed Political Constitution of the Republic of Chile, which sought to replace the Chilean Constitution of 1980